A list of Bangladeshi films released in 1985.

Releases

References

See also

1985 in Bangladesh
[[List of Bangladeshi films of
1986]]
List of Bangladeshi films
Cinema of Bangladesh

Film
Lists of 1985 films by country or language
 1985